This is a list of musicians who played in the Canadian punk rock group SNFU.  The band formed in 1981 in Edmonton, relocated to Vancouver a decade later, and became inactive in 2018. Thirty-one musicians played in the various lineups of SNFU, counting four guest members, with only singer Ken Chinn (credited as 'Mr. Chi Pig') remaining constant prior to his death in 2020.  Among twenty-seven official members, these lineups included one singer, six guitarists, ten bassists (twice counting Ken Fleming, who served at different times as the band's bassist and guitarist), and eleven drummers.  The lineups also included one guest bassist and three guest drummers.

After Chinn, founding guitarists Marc and Brent Belke served the longest tenures, at 22 and 15 years respectively, discounting the band's inactive time.  Bassist Rob Johnson played with the group for nine years, while Fleming and bassist Dave Bacon each spread two stints in the group over nearly eight years.  The longest-standing consistent lineup lasted from late 1992 to early 1998 and featured Chinn, both Belkes, Johnson, and drummer Dave Rees.

Chinn twice revamped the group's entire lineup, once each in 2007 and 2014.  Six members left the group and later returned, with Bacon's 27-year hiatus between 1987 and 2014 the longest.  Only Chinn and drummer Jon Card played in all three eras of the band's career, divided by their 1989 and 2005 breakups.  (Bassist Curtis Creager also had been slated to do so in a 2014 tour, but the tour was canceled.)

Member history
Chinn co-founded the band in Edmonton with Brent and Marc Belke, guitar-playing twin brothers who served as members of the group until 1998 and 2005 respectively.  The period between their formation and first breakup, spanning from 1981 to 1989, included membership from four bassists and three drummers.  Bassist Warren Bidlock and drummer Evan C. Jones completed their initial lineup.  After Bidlock's 1982 departure, Scott Juskiw filled in for the band's demo recording before Jimmy Schmitz joined.  This incarnation continued into 1985, when Dave Bacon and Jon Card replaced Schmitz and Jones, respectively.  Ted Simm spelled Card in 1986, while Bacon was replaced by Curtis Creager the following year.

For their 1991 reunion tour, Chinn and the Belke brothers reenlisted Creager and Card.  When they returned to full-time activity in their new home of Vancouver several months later, Ken Fleming replaced Creager, while Dave Rees replaced Card shortly thereafter.  Rob Johnson began a nine-year tenure as the band's bassist late in 1992, which completed their classic, best-selling, and most prolific lineup.

Brent Belke and Rees both departed early in 1998, and with drummer Sean Stubbs, SNFU became a four-piece band.  Chris Thompson replaced Stubbs the following year, while Johnson was replaced by Matt Warhurst in 2001.  The band went on hiatus shortly thereafter, however, with Thompson then departing.  Chinn, Marc Belke, and Warhurst employed studio drummer Trevor MacGregor and finished recordings for a new record in 2003, and returned to activity later that year with new drummer Shane Smith.  This era of the group ended in 2005, when they again disbanded.

Two years later, Chinn and Fleming (now playing guitar) began a new incarnation of the group that would eventually involve three bassists, three drummers, and one second guitarist.  The initial new lineup was completed by bassist Bryan McCallum and drummer Chad Mareels, although McCallum was soon replaced by Denis Nowoselski.  Smith returned as the group's drummer late in 2008, and was replaced two years later by Card.  In mid-2010, rhythm guitarist Sean Colig was added, completing the group's first five-member lineup in 12 years.  Kerry Cyr replaced Nowoselski in 2012, and Junior Kittlitz spelled Card for touring in late 2013.

In February 2014, the band announced an entirely new lineup based around Chinn, the returning Bacon, guitarists Kurt Robertson and Randy Steffes, and drummer Adrian White.  White was replaced by Jamie Oliver, and briefly guest drummer Txutxo Krueger, in July.  Although the band planned to tour with Creager and Simm returning to the lineup in November, the tour was canceled, and Bacon and Oliver remained with the group.  Basque drummer Batikão Est joined in 2016.  The band announced a hiatus in March 2018, and Chinn died on July 16, 2020.

Timeline

Note: lighter colors denote periods of inactivity in which the band was not officially disbanded.

Lineup chronology

References

Snfu